Somebody's Hero is a 2012 American family feature film written and directed by Darin Beckstead, starring Christopher Gorham, Susan Misner, and Arthur Nascarella.

History

Somebody's Hero was filmed and set in New York City, where it later won "Best Feature" at the Coney Island Film Festival. It was further recognized by the Waterfront Film Festival, the Heartland Film Festival, and Newport Beach Film Festival.

Premise
An accountant stops a robbery while wearing a superhero costume, becoming a role model to a fatherless boy.

Cast 

 Christopher Gorham as Dennis Sullivan
 Susan Misner as Katie Wells
 Ben Hyland as Jake Wells
 Novella Nelson as Maureen
 Arthur Nascarella as Donald Delansky
 Pamela Shaw as Miss Malechek

Synopsis 

An ordinary accountant, Dennis Sullivan (Christopher Gorham), secretly plays superhero while falling for his widowed client; Katie Wells (Susan Misner) and her hero-obsessed son (Ben Hyland).

Production
The film was written and directed by Darin Beckstead.

References

External links
 
 
 Official Trailer

American children's films
American superhero films
2012 films
Films set in New York City
2010s English-language films
2010s American films